Walter Finch Mason (27 December 1847 – 18 October 1924) was a New Zealand cricketer who made five appearances, three of them first class appearances, for Wellington between 1873 and 1876. He made a duck on debut against Nelson on 27 December 1872; four and two against Hawke's Bay on 17 January 1874; and then 12 and zero in his first class debut on 17 March.

Notes

External links

1847 births
1924 deaths
New Zealand cricketers
Wellington cricketers
People from Hart District
English emigrants to New Zealand